The Klein Furkahorn (3,026 m) is a mountain of the Urner Alps, overlooking the Furka Pass on the border between the Swiss cantons of Valais and Uri. It lies near the southern end of the Galenstock-Gross Furkahorn chain, east of the Rhone Glacier.

From the Furka Pass a trail leads to its summit.

References

External links
 Klein Furkahorn on Hikr

Mountains of the Alps
Alpine three-thousanders
Mountains of Switzerland
Mountains of Valais
Mountains of the canton of Uri
Uri–Valais border